Northorpe Higher railway station served the Northorpe area of Mirfield, in West Yorkshire, England.

History
Northorpe Station was situated on the north side of Shillbank Lane, with the platforms, buildings and covered access stairs being built from wood. On 11 July 1921 a passing  goods train started a grass fire at around 6 p.m., which spread to the station buildings, destroying them and damaging the track when the canopy fell. The station was replaced the same year with Northorpe Higher station, this time south of the overbridge over Shillbank Lane.

The station was closed to passengers on 5 September 1953.

References

Disused railway stations in Kirklees
Former London and North Western Railway stations
Railway stations in Great Britain opened in 1900
Railway stations in Great Britain closed in 1953